The governor of Guimaras, is the chief executive of the provincial government of Ifugao.

Governors of the Sub-province of Guimaras (1966-1992)

Provincial Governors (1992-2025)

References

Governors of Guimaras
Guimaras